The following highways are numbered 726:

Costa Rica
 National Route 726

United States
  Georgia State Route 726 (former)
  Louisiana Highway 726
  Maryland Route 726
  Nevada State Route 726
 New Jersey:
  County Route 726 (Camden County, New Jersey)
  County Route 726 (Cumberland County, New Jersey)
  County Route 726 (Hudson County, New Jersey)
  Ohio State Route 726
 Virginia
  Virginia State Route 726 (Norfolk and Princess Anne Counties) (former)
  Virginia State Route 726 (1931-1933) (former)